Charles Henry Gaus (September 1, 1840 in Zanesville, Muskingum County, Ohio – October 31, 1909 in the Laurentian Mountains, Quebec, Canada) was an American businessman and politician.

Life
He was born of German parents in Ohio, but the family moved to Brooklyn, New York when he was two years old. In 1857 he went to Albany, New York, and worked at his uncle's drugstore. He fought in the American Civil War. In 1874, he opened his own drugstore on the corner of Washington Av. and Lark St. in Albany.

Gaus was an expert marksman, winning the Wimbledon Cup in 1889, 1890, 1891 and 1892.

In Albany, he was at times a supervisor, School Commissioner, City Street Commissioner and City Assessor, and was Mayor from 1902 to 1908. He was New York State Comptroller from January 1, 1909, until his death, elected in 1908 on the Republican ticket. He was ill most of the time, and First Deputy Comptroller Otto Kelsey actually ran the office.

Gaus died from pneumonia during a vacation at a hunting lodge on the preserve of the Bourbinnais-Kiamika Club on Long Lake in the Laurentian Mountains. He was buried at Albany Rural Cemetery.

Sources
 Obit in NYT, on November 1, 1909
The Political Graveyard: Index to Politicians: Gatesman to Gayheart at politicalgraveyard.com Political Graveyard

1840 births
1909 deaths
American people of German descent
New York State Comptrollers
Politicians from Zanesville, Ohio
Mayors of Albany, New York
Deaths from pneumonia in Quebec
Burials at Albany Rural Cemetery
New York (state) Republicans
American expatriates in Canada
Union military personnel